This is a list of notable Congregational churches, meaning churches either as notable congregations or as notable buildings of the same name.

Australia

Elsternwick Congregational Church (1894–1977); Orrong Road, Elsternwick, Victoria

China

Teng Shih K'ou Congregational Church (built in 1864, demolished between 1966 and 1976); Dongcheng District, Beijing

United Kingdom

Following is a list of notable churches in the U.K. that are identified as Congregational, either currently or historically.

United States
In the United States, numerous Congregational churches are notable, some for their buildings that are listed on the National Register of Historic Places and/or on state and local historic registers.  This list in progress includes most NRHP-listed buildings and other notable American congregations, too.

American Congregational churches include:

(by state then city or town)

References

Congregational